This Bliss is an American indie electronic band from Massachusetts.

History
Singer-songwriter Jess Baggia released her debut studio EP, entitled Back in the Game, in 2009, which is described as a collection of pop compositions, with influences from roots, blues and Americana music. Baggia performed around the Greater Boston area, building a fan base, and selling out popular local music venues, before being joined by Tom Maroon and Nick Zampiello. Zampiello has won two Boston Music Awards. Originally conceived as a studio project, Baggia and Zampiello formed the band This Bliss to explore their take on electronic rock. Shortly thereafter, Maroon joined them to round out the trio. The band describes as themselves as "true grime," and they draw comparison to the music of St. Lucia and Portishead.

Mint 400 Records
In 2018, This Bliss signed with Mint 400 Records. They released their debut album Forensic Styles, described by Patch Medias Sam Bayer as "a cinematic dreamscape that explores the world of trip-hop and electronica through the lens of a crime novelist," on 18 September 2018. The album features drum machines and synthesizers, and draws inspiration from the television show Forensic Files. 

The album is described as "electronic soul," and Impose calls the single "Believe" a "shimmering, whirring track engulfs you in heavy electronica in a pop style similar to CHVRCHES but more atmospheric." The track "Make it Real" features Baggia's "cool vocals slink[ing] and sway[ing] over electro beats and tremolo guitar."

Members
Jess Baggia – vocals and guitar
Nick Zampiello – drums, sampling and synths
Former
Tom Maroon – guitar and vocals

Discography

Albums
Forensic Styles (2018)
Dramatization of Real Events (2019)
Forensically Restyled (2020)
Retroshade (2021)

Singles
"Believe" (2018)
"Talk Talk Talk" (2019)
"Friend" (2021)

References

Citations

Bibliography

External links

Indie rock musical groups from Massachusetts
Mint 400 Records artists
Musical groups established in 2017
2017 establishments in Massachusetts